V. K. Raju is an Indian politician and former Member of the Legislative Assembly of Tamil Nadu. He was elected to the Tamil Nadu legislative assembly as a Dravida Munnetra Kazhagam candidate from Arakkonam constituency in 1977, 1984 and 1989 elections.

References 

Dravida Munnetra Kazhagam politicians
Year of birth missing
Possibly living people
Tamil Nadu MLAs 1985–1989